Pulsarella clevei is a species of sea snail, a marine gastropod mollusk in the family Borsoniidae.

Description
The length of the shell attains 9 mm. The shell is spirally costate. Its color is white, fasciate with light brown. The outer lip crenulate, ridged within, with a shallow, wide sinus. The columellar lip has a median callosity.

Distribution
This marine species occurs off Sri Lanka

References

 Kilburn R.N. (1986). Turridae (Mollusca: Gastropoda) of southern Africa and Mozambique. Part 3. Subfamily Borsoniinae. Annals of the Natal Museum. 27: 633-720.

External links
 
 Jousseaume, F. (1883). Description d’espèces et genres nouveaux de mollusques. Bulletin de la Société Zoologique de France. 8: 186-204, pl. 10. page(s): 200

clevei
Gastropods described in 1883